Saint-Maximin is a commune in the Oise department in northern France.

Quarries
Saint-Maximin is noted for its quarries, which are the source of Saint-Maximin limestone, a widely used French building stone.

See also
 Communes of the Oise department

References

Communes of Oise